Xi Tauri (ξ Tau, ξ Tauri) is a hierarchical quadruple system in the constellation Taurus.

Xi Tauri is a spectroscopic and eclipsing quadruple star. It consists of three blue-white B-type main sequence stars and an F-type main sequence star. Two of the stars form an eclipsing binary system and revolve around each other once every 7.15 days.  These in turn orbit the third star once every 145 days. The fourth star is a F star that orbits the other three stars in a roughly fifty-year period and has been resolved optically.  The brightest and most massive of the four stars is the "third" star, although the eclipsing pair have a greater combined mass and hence are generally considered to be the primary.

The typical combined apparent magnitude of the system is +3.73, but because the stars eclipse one another during their orbits, it is classified as a variable star, and its brightness varies from magnitude +3.73 to +3.81. Xi Tauri is approximately 210 light years from Earth.

Nomenclature for the four stars varies.  Some sources refer to the faint resolved companion as component C, while others refer to it as B.  Similarly, the inner three stars are respectively Aa, Ab, and B, or Aa, Ab, and Ac.

References

Astrometric binaries
Eclipsing binaries
Spectroscopic binaries
Tauri, Xi
Taurus (constellation)
4
B-type main-sequence stars
Tauri, 002
016083
1038
021364
Durchmusterung objects